The Louisiana–Monroe Warhawks (ULM Warhawks) are the intercollegiate athletics teams representing the University of Louisiana at Monroe (ULM). ULM currently fields 15 varsity teams (six men's and nine women's) in 11 sports and competes at the National Collegiate Athletic Association (NCAA) Division I (Football Bowl Subdivision in football) level as a member of the Sun Belt Conference.

Nickname
The nickname for the Louisiana–Monroe sports teams are the Warhawks. 
 
Nickname controversy

On January 30, 2006, university president James Cofer announced officially that ULM would be retiring the 75-year-old "Indians" mascot in light of new NCAA restrictions against Indigenous-themed mascots, which the NCAA considers "hostile and abusive" to Native Americans, despite issuing an appeal to the NCAA to keep the name after the NCAA's ruling allowing Florida State to keep their Seminoles nickname. This came a few days after a mascot committee voted unanimously in favor of the change. The university accepted suggestions for the new mascot through February 28, 2006. The mascot committee then selected 12 semifinalists.

An online poll, available to students, faculty, staff, alumni, donors and the public, yielded three semifinalists: "Warhawks," "Bayou Gators" and "Bayou Hawks." The school's mascot committee passed a single recommendation to the university president, who made the final decision. Warhawks was announced as ULM's new mascot on April 5, 2006 and implemented on June 26, 2006. The new nickname honors Maj. Gen. Claire Lee Chennault, an LSU alumnus, and his Air Force unit from World War II, which utilized the Curtiss P-40 Warhawk in battle, although the logos primarily use bird imagery.

Sports sponsored

Baseball 

The baseball team is coached by Mike Federico, and won the 2008 Sun Belt Conference Championship.  The team's home field is Warhawk Field. In 2012, the Warhawks won the Sun Belt Conference Baseball Tournament and earned the conference's automatic bid to play in the NCAA Division I Baseball Tournament. The ULM Warhawks have won 14 baseball regular season or tournament conference championships.

Women's beach volleyball 
The Louisiana–Monroe Warhawks women's beach volleyball team competes in NCAA Division I beach volleyball in Conference USA (C-USA). The program, founded in 2013, competed as an independent until joining the Coastal Collegiate Sports Association for the 2020 season (2019–20 school year). After the 2021 season, ULM joined the newly founded C-USA beach volleyball league.

Football 

The Warhawks college football team dates back to 1931, and currently competes in the NCAA Football Bowl Subdivision. Playing as a member of the Sun Belt Conference (Sun Belt), the Warhawks play their home games at Malone Stadium, located on the campus. Since December 2015, Matt Viator has served as the Warhawks' head coach. As the Indians, Monroe captured or shared four Southland Conference championships and won the 1987 I-AA National Championship.

The program has sent several players into the professional ranks, including Stan Humphries, Bubby Brister, Chris Harris, Doug Pederson, Marty Booker, Teddy Garcia, Roosevelt Potts, Joe Profit, Cardia Jackson and Smokey Stover into the National Football League, Steven Jyles into the Canadian Football League and Raymond Philyaw into the Arena League.

2012 was the first season since moving to the Football Bowl Subdivision that Louisiana–Monroe had a winning season.

Men's basketball 

Men's and women's basketball teams play home games at Fant-Ewing Coliseum, a 7,000-seat on-campus arena that opened in 1971. The largest crowd to watch a men's basketball game at Fant-Ewing Coliseum was 8,044, who watched the Northeast Louisiana Indians play the Louisiana Tech Bulldogs on January 25, 1979.

The ULM Warhawks have won 19 men's basketball regular season, tournament or divisional conference championships.

Women's basketball 

The largest crowd to watch a women's basketball game at Fant-Ewing Coliseum was 8,155, who watched the Northeast Louisiana Lady Indians play the Louisiana Tech Lady Techsters on February 11, 1985. The ULM Warhawks have won five women's basketball regular season or tournament conference championships.

Men's cross country 

The ULM Warhawks have won five men's cross country conference championships.

Women's cross country 

The ULM Warhawks have won two women's cross country conference championships.

Men's golf 

The ULM Warhawks have won two men's golf conference championships.

Women's golf

Women's soccer

Softball 

The ULM Warhawks have won two softball regular season or tournament conference championships.

Women's tennis 

The ULM Warhawks have won nine women's tennis regular season or tournament conference championships.

Men's track and field 

The ULM Warhawks have won nine men's outdoor track & field conference championships.

Women's track and field 

The ULM Warhawks have won four women's outdoor track & field conference championships.

Women's volleyball

Non-varsity sports

Water skiing
The University of Louisiana at Monroe Water Ski Team has been the dominant ski team since the inception of collegiate water ski competition in 1979, capturing 29 National Championship titles over the past 38 years.

Championships

NCAA team championships

As of April 4, 2016, Louisiana Monroe has 1 NCAA team national championship.

Men's (1)
Football (1): 1987
See also:
Sun Belt Conference NCAA team championships
List of NCAA schools with the most NCAA Division I championships

Conference championships
The ULM Warhawks have won 75 men's and 24 women's regular-season, tournament or divisional conference championships.

 Men's 
 Basketball (19): 2007D, 1997, 1996, 1996T, 1994, 1993, 1993T, 1992T 1991, 1991T, 1990, 1990T, 1986, 1986T, 1982T, 1980, 1979T, 1965, 1962
 Tennis (18): 1997, 1996, 1995T 1994, 1993, 1992, 1990, 1989, 1988, 1987, 1985, 1984, 1982, 1981, 1980, 1965, 1964, 1963
 Baseball (14): 2012T, 2008, 2002, 2000, 1999, 1996, 1995T, 1983, 1982, 1970, 1969, 1968, 1966, 1964
 Outdoor Track & Field (9): 1988, 1987, 1970, 1969, 1964, 1963, 1962, 1960, 1959
 Football (5): 2005, 1992, 1990, 1987, 1982
 Cross Country (5): 1965, 1964, 1962, 1961, 1959
 Indoor Track & Field (3): 1988, 1987, 1986
 Golf (2): 2004, 1968
 Women's 
 Women's Tennis (9): 2017, 2003T, 1997, 1996, 1995, 1993, 1992, 1991, 1984
 Women's Basketball (5): 2005, 1987, 1985, 1984, 1983T
 Women's Outdoor Track and Field (4): 1989, 1988, 1987, 1986
 Softball (2): 1997, 1986T
 Women's Indoor Track & Field (2): 1989, 1987
 Women's Cross Country (2): 1986, 1985

T indicates a conference tournament championship.  D indicates a divisional conference championship.

Athletic facilities

Athletic venues and facilities include:
 Football: Malone Stadium
 Basketball: Fant–Ewing Coliseum
 Baseball: Warhawk Field
 Beach Volleyball: ULM Sand Volleyball Complex
 Cross Country Selman Field Cross Country Course
 Golf: Bayou Desiard Country Club
 Soccer: Brown Stadium
 Softball: Geo-Surfaces Field at the ULM Softball Complex
 Tennis: Raymond Heard Stadium
 Track and Field: Groseclose Track at Brown Stadium
 Volleyball: Fant–Ewing Coliseum

Rivalries 
The Warhawks have Sun Belt rivalries with every West Division school (Little Rock, Arkansas State, Louisiana, UT Arlington, and Texas State). Their fiercest Sun Belt rivals are Arkansas State Red Wolves and Louisiana Ragin' Cajuns.

Football 
Football rivalries involving Warhawk sports teams include:

Warhawks Sports Radio Network
ULM launched the Warhawk Sports Radio Network in 2007. The Network is a series of radio stations that provide access to sporting events throughout Northeast Louisiana. Three Monroe radio stations, KLIP, KMLB and KRJO, provide play by play radio commentary.  The full list of participating stations are:
 KLIP 105.3 FM in Monroe (Football, Men's basketball)
KMLB 105.7 FM / 540 AM in Monroe (Women's basketball, Baseball)
 KRJO 1680 AM in Monroe (Basketball)

See also
List of NCAA Division I institutions

References

External links
 

 
Sports teams in Monroe, Louisiana